Carex × abitibiana is a hybrid species of sedge that was first described by Lepage in 1959.

References

abitibiana
Plants described in 1959
Plant nothospecies